The men's 200 metre freestyle S5 event at the 2012 Paralympic Games took place on 1 September, at the London Aquatics Centre.

Two heats were held, one with five swimmers and one with six swimmers. The swimmers with the eight fastest times advanced to the final.

Heats

Heat 1

Heat 2

Final

References

Swimming at the 2012 Summer Paralympics